Maria Odeth Tavares (born 18 August 1976) is a retired Angolan team handball goalkeeper. She is 5'7" and 165 lbs and last played for Primeiro de Agosto.

2009 World Cup
Odeth Tavares was the top goalkeeper at the 2009 Women's World Cup in China.

Summer Olympics
Tavares wore the #1 jersey with Angola at the 2000 and 2004 Summer olympics.

References

External links
 
 Odete Tavares Yahoo! Sport

1976 births
Living people
People from Benguela
Angolan female handball players
Olympic handball players of Angola
Handball players at the 2000 Summer Olympics
Handball players at the 2004 Summer Olympics
Handball players at the 2008 Summer Olympics
African Games gold medalists for Angola
African Games medalists in handball
Competitors at the 2011 All-Africa Games